Yury Dmitrievich (26 November 1374 in Pereslavl-Zalessky – 5 June 1434 in Galich), also known as George II of Moscow, Yury of Zvenigorod  and Jurij Zwenihorodski, was the second son of Dmitri Donskoi. He was the Duke of Zvenigorod and Galich from 1389 until his death. During the reign of his brother Vasily I, he took part in the campaigns against Torzhok (1392), Zhukotin (1414), and Novgorod (1417). He was the chief orchestrator of the Muscovite Civil War against his nephew, Vasily II, in the course of which he twice took Moscow, in 1433 and 1434.

Family matters
By his wife, Anastasia, the daughter of Yury of Smolensk, Yury had three sons — Vasily Kosoy, Dmitry Shemyaka, and Dmitry Krasny. The marriage to Anastasia made him the brother-in-law of Švitrigaila, Grand Duke of Lithuania.

Inheritance and claims
At his father's death, Yury received in appanage the towns of Zvenigorod, Ruza, and Galich.

Upon his brother's death, Yury immediately asserted his claim to the throne of Muscovy against that of Vasily's son, Vasily II. He referenced the old house law of the House of Rurik, whereby the senior throne in the dynasty passed from brother to brother, rather than from father to son. He also interpreted in his favour the testament of Dmitry Donskoy, written at the time when Vasily had been unmarried and childless.

Treaty with Vasily II
In 1430, Yury and his nephew decided that the issue would be settled in the Golden Horde. The Khan supported the claim of Vasily II, but allowed Yury to take the appanage of his deceased younger brother, Peter of Dmitrov. This decision did not fully satisfy Vasily, who took Dmitrov by force and expelled Yury's governor from the town in 1432. In response, Yury rallied his forces and advanced on Pereslavl-Zalessky. Vasily II was defeated on the bank of the Klyazma River and fled to Kostroma. After that, Yury entered Moscow in triumph and proclaimed himself Grand Duke.

Instead of imprisoning his nephew, Yury allowed him to settle in Kolomna and rule the town as his appanage. This show of magnanimity cost him dearly, as scores of Muscovite boyars and noblemen fled to Vasily's court in Kolomna. This shift in momentum impelled Yury to conclude a treaty with Vasily, whereby the uncle renounced his claims to Moscow, promised to deny assistance to his sons, and exchanged Dmitrov for other territories. Vasily returned to Moscow, while Yury withdrew to Galich.

Further conflicts
The following year, Kosoy and Shemyaka defeated Vasily II on the banks of the Kus River. The grand prince was informed that Yury's troops had been seen among his enemies and decided to punish him for this treachery. In winter 1434, he set Galich ablaze, but Yury had escaped northward to Belozersk. On 16 March, the armies of the uncle and the nephew clashed between Rostov and Pereslavl. Vasily's army was roundly defeated and he sought refuge in Nizhny Novgorod.

On 31 March 1434, on the Bright Week Wednesday, Yury again entered Moscow, where he captured Vasily's family and treasury. He was preparing a new campaign against Vasily when he died suddenly, on 5 July 1434, succeeded by his eldest son, Vasily Kosoy.

References

External links
  Biography of George II of Moscow
 

1374 births
1434 deaths
15th-century Grand Princes of Moscow
People from Pereslavl-Zalessky
Grand Princes of Moscow
Rurik dynasty
14th-century Russian people
15th-century Russian people
Medieval Russian military personnel
14th-century military personnel
15th-century military personnel